Camopi is a commune of French Guiana, an overseas region and department of France located in South America. Camopi is mainly inhabited by Amerindians of the Wayampi and Teko tribes.

History 

In 1738, a Jesuit mission opened on the river Oyapock near the current town of Camopi. The missionaries brought European diseases and caused a depopulation. In 1763, the Jesuits left and most of the population dispersed.

During the 18th and 19th century, the Teko had moved into the area which had been home to the Wayampi, and by the 1830s, their territories overlap, however the tribes remained isolated. In 1930s, France and Brasil renewed their interest in the area, and wanted to establish borders. Medical facilities were established in the mid-1950s followed by a school. In the 1960s attempts were made to group the population into bigger villages with limited success. A granman (paramount chief) was installed according to the Maroon hierarchy, but failed to catch on.

In 1969, the town of Camopi was established. Parts of the tribes rejected the modernisations, and in 1970 access to the commune had been restricted. In 1987, Jacques Chirac as Prime Minister had established Zones of Collective Use Rights (ZDUC). ZDUC means that the villages have communal land for hunting, fishing, agriculture and gathering.

In the late 1980s, gold had been discovered around the river Camopi. Illegal gold miners have moved into area, and villages of Vila Brasil and Ilha Bela had been established opposite the town of Camopi on the other side of the river Oyapock. The 3rd Foreign Infantry Regiment has set up a camp to protect the border. Even though Vila Brasil had been built illegally in a nature reserve, Brazil designated Vila Brasil as a district of the municipality in 2011. In 2013, the access to the village of Camopi was no longer restricted, and the town had slowly opened for tourism. The southern village cluster of Trois Sauts still requires a special permit from the Prefecture. In the early 21st century, the Amerindians started to built hamlets with subsistence farms several kilometres from the town of Camopi. By 2010, there were 45 hamlets, and most had left the main town.

Geography 

The village of Camopi, seat of the commune, lies on the border with Brazil at the confluence of the rivers Camopi and Oyapock. The commune can only be reached by boat or via the air. It is served by Camopi Airport.

Mont Itoupé, the second highest mountain of French Guiana, is located within the commune.

Climate
Camopi has a tropical monsoon climate (Köppen climate classification Am).

Villages
 Alikoto Tapele
 Trois Sauts

See also
Communes of French Guiana

References

Bibliography

External links
 Camopi at Annuaire Mairie (in French)

 
Communes of French Guiana
Indigenous villages in French Guiana